A.S.D.C. Ba.Se. 96 Seveso (briefly Ba.Se. 96) is an Italian association football club situated in Seveso, Lombardy. It currently plays in Promozione. Its colors are red and green.

The club was founded in 1996 following the merge between the two most important football associations existing on the territory of the municipality of Seveso: Baruccana Foot Ball Club and Associazione Sportiva Seveso.

The union of forces bears results until culminating in the 2007/2008 season, when the first team participates in the Serie D championship (higher amateur division of the Italian football league system).

In 2009 celebrations took place to honour the 100th anniversary since the foundation of A.S. Seveso, the town's oldest club, established in 1909.

History and honours

Championship: 1996/1997 - Category: Promozione - Place 6th – Points 47

Championship: 1997/1998 - Category: Promozione - Place 9th – Points 40

Championship: 1998/1999 - Category: Promozione - Place 11th – Points 36

Championship: 1999/2000 - Category: Promozione - Place 7th – Points 41

Championship: 2000/2001 - Category: Promozione - Place 7th – Points 41

Championship: 2001/2002 - Category: Promozione - Place 3rd – Points 47

Championship: 2002/2003 - Category: Promozione - Place 2nd – Points 61

Championship: 2003/2004 - Category: Promozione - Place 5th – Points 42 – 3 matches played in Coppa Italia Dilettanti

Championship: 2004/2005 - Category: Promozione - Place 1st – Points 68 (promoted) – 4 matches played in Coppa Italia Dilettanti

Championship: 2005/2006 - Category: Eccellenza - Place 8th – Points 45 – 3 matches played in Coppa Italia Dilettanti

Championship: 2006/2007 - Category: Eccellenza - Place 3rd – Points 63 (promoted) – 3 matches played in Coppa Italia Dilettanti

Championship: 2007/2008 - Category: Serie D - Place 17th – Points 26 (relegated)  – 2 matches played in Coppa Italia Dilettanti

Championship: 2008/2009 - Category: Eccellenza - Place 13th – Points 37 – 3 matches played in Coppa Italia Dilettanti

Championship: 2009/2010 - Category: Eccellenza - Place 12th – Points 37 – 8 matches played in Coppa Italia Dilettanti

Championship: 2010/2011 - Category: Eccellenza - Place 8th – Points 47 – 3 matches played in Coppa Italia Dilettanti

Championship: 2011/2012 - Category: Eccellenza - Place 11th – Points 43 – 3 matches played in Coppa Italia Dilettanti

Championship: 2012/2013 - Category: Eccellenza - Place 12th – Points 45 – 4 matches played in Coppa Italia Dilettanti

Championship: 2013/2014 - Category: Eccellenza - Place 15th – Points 27 (relegated) – 3 matches played in Coppa Italia Dilettanti

Championship: 2014/2015 - Category: Promozione - Place 16th – Points 25 (relegated) – 3 matches played in Coppa Italia Dilettanti

Championship: 2015/2016 - Category: Prima Categoria - Place 1st – Points 58 (promoted) – 3 matches played in Coppa Italia Dilettanti

Championship: 2016/2017 - Category: Promozione - Place 2nd – Points 59 – 3 matches played in Coppa Italia Dilettanti

Championship: 2017/2018 - Category: Promozione - Place 6th – Points 49 – 3 matches played in Coppa Italia Dilettanti

Championship: 2018/2019 - Category: Promozione - Place 5th – Points 52 – 3 matches played in Coppa Italia Dilettanti

Championship: 2019/2020 - Category: Promozione - Place 2nd – Points 37 (promoted) – 3 matches played in Coppa Italia Dilettanti

Championship: 2020/2021 - Category: Eccellenza - Place 6th – Points 13

Championship: 2021/2022 - Category: Eccellenza - Place 14th – Points 27 (relegated after the playout)

Championship: 2022/2023 - Category: Promozione

Notable players

External links
 Official website

Football clubs in Italy
Association football clubs established in 1996
Football clubs in Lombardy
1996 establishments in Italy